Françoise is a French feminine given name (equivalent to the Italian Francesca) and may refer to:

 Anne Françoise Elizabeth Lange (1772–1816), French actress
 Claudine Françoise Mignot (1624–1711), French adventuress
 Françoise Adnet (1924-2014), French figurative painter
 Françoise Ardré (1931-2010), French phycologist and marine scientist
 Françoise Arnoul (1931–2021), French actress
 Françoise Atlan (born 1964), Moroccan singer
 Françoise Balibar (born 1941), French physicist and science historian
 Françoise Ballet-Blu (born 1964), French politician
 Françoise Barré-Sinoussi (born 1947), virologist and Nobel Prize winner
 Françoise Basseporte (1701–1780), French painter
 Françoise Bertaut de Motteville (c. 1621–1689), French memoir writer
 Françoise Bertin (1925-2014), French actress
 Françoise Boivin (born 1960), Canadian politician
 Françoise Bonnet (born 1957), French long-distance runner
 Françoise Bourdin (1952–2022), French novelist
 Françoise Briand (born 1951), French politician
 Francoise Brun-Cottan (born 1944), French-American voice actor
 Françoise Castex (born 1956), French politician
 Françoise Chandernagor (born 1945), French writer
 Françoise Claustre (1937–2006), French archaeologist
 Françoise d'Amboise (1427–1485), Carmelite nun
 Françoise d'Aubigné, marquise de Maintenon (1635–1719), morganatic second wife of Louis XIV of France
 Françoise d'Eaubonne (1920–2005), French feminist
 Françoise de Graffigny (1695–1758), French writer
 Françoise David (born 1948), Knight of the National Order of Quebec
 Françoise de Cezelli (1558–1615), French chevalier and war hero
 Françoise de Foix (c. 1495–1537), mistress of Francis I of France
 Françoise Dior (1932–1993), French neo-Nazi
 Françoise Dolto (1908–1988), French doctor and psychoanalyst
 Françoise Dorin (1928–2018), French actor, comedian, novelist, playwright and songwriter
 Françoise Dorléac (1942–1967), popular French actress
 Françoise Dubois (born 1947), French politician
 Françoise Ducros, Canadian civil servant
 Françoise Dunand (born 1934), French Egyptologist and archaeologist
 Françoise Dupuy (1925–2022), French dancer and choreographer
 Françoise Dürr (born 1942), former tennis player
 Françoise Faucher (born 1929), French film actress
 Françoise Foning (1949–2015), Cameroonian businessperson and politician 
 Françoise Forton (1957–2022), Brazilian actress
 Françoise Gilot (born 1921), French born painter
 Françoise Giroud (1916–2003), French journalist, screenwriter, writer and politician
 Françoise Grossetête (born 1946), French politician
 Françoise Hardy (born 1944), French singer, actress and astrologer
 Françoise Héritier (1933-2017), French anthropologist
 Françoise Lebrun, French actress
 Françoise Macchi (born 1951), French former alpine skier
 Françoise Mallet-Joris (1930-2016), Belgian writer
 Françoise Matraire (19th century), printer
 Françoise Mbango Etone (born 1976), track and field athlete
 Françoise Meltzer (born 1947), professor of religion
 Françoise Mouly (born 1955), Paris-born French artist and designer
 Françoise Prévost (c. 1680–1741), French ballerina
 Françoise Robertson, actress
 Françoise Rosay (1891–1974), French actress
 Françoise Sagan (1935–2004), French playwright, novelist and screenwriter
 Françoise Thom (born 1951), French historian and Sovietologist
 Françoise Yip (born 1972), Canadian actress
 Ghislaine Marie Françoise Dommanget (1900–1991), French actress
 Jeanne Françoise Julie Adélaïde Récamier (1777–1849), French socialite
 Louise Françoise Contat (1760–1813), French actress
 Marie Françoise Sophie Gay (1776–1852), French author

See also
Françoise Lake, a waterbody crossed by Opawica River in Québec, Canada
Françoise River, a tributary of the rivière aux Anglais in Rivière-aux-Outardes, Quebec, Canada
Françoise-Athénaïs
Marie-Françoise
Sainte-Françoise, Quebec (disambiguation)
François

French feminine given names